Razorjack is an independent comic book created, written and illustrated by John Higgins, published first by Higgins' own Jack Publishing and later by Com.X.

Publication history
Razorjack's first appearance was a fifteen-page strip entitled 'Citadel' that appeared in the first and only issue of Higgins' self-published anthology comic Razorjack (Jack Publishing, 1999).

Razorjack returned in a two-issue comic book limited series published by Com.X in 2001.

In May 2018, Higgins and writer Michael Carroll incorporated Razorjack into the Judge Dredd universe in Judge Dredd Megazine #396.

Plot
Razorjack tells the story of three college students who inadvertently create an opening into an alternate universe - known by its inhabitants as The Twist Dimension - and consequently become a target for the evil Razorjack.

Police officers Ross and Frame investigate the results of Razorjack's killing spree and are drawn into what is potentially the ultimate battle between good and evil.

Collected editions
The Razorjack: Collected Edition trade paperback was published in 2009 by Com.X and contains all of the previously published material plus a new four-page short story.

Two limited-edition box-sets of Razorjack were published by Foruli (with Loco Motive Studios and Com.x) in 2009: The Signature Edition contains a signed 96-page book in a slipcase (collecting the same material as the trade paperback), accompanied by a signed screenprint. Limited to 45 copies. The Deluxe Edition contains the above plus an original painting by John Higgins. Limited to 15 copies

Reception
Newsarama suggested it "comes off as the Cthulhu mythos mixed with a really nasty episode of Law & Order" and that "[t]here are echoes here of Clive Barker and the aforementioned Lovecraft, but those are just part of a stream of ideas that sail along in a much different way due to the comics format," concluding that "[i]f there’s a downside to the volume, it’s that it’s over in a seemingly short period of time."

Notes

References

External links
John Higgins' official website

Interviews
5 Questions with John Higgins, Twelve Fingers, April 20, 2009
John Higgins: Interview Part One, Wonderchroma, May 19, 2009
Good, Trashy Fun: An Interview with John Higgins, Forbidden Planet blog, June 5, 2009
John Higgins’ Razorjack: comic-book villainy has never been so fun, The Times, July 1, 2009
On the Razor's Edge Part 1, Broken Frontier, July 20, 2009

Reviews
 Razorjack #1, the X-Axis, April 1, 2001
 Razorjackery, Comixology, April 1, 2009
 Razorjack review, The Guardian, April 25, 2009
 Razorjack, Eclipse Magazine, June 24, 2009
 Razorjack – a taste for handmaidens in fetish gear and terrible dentistry, Forbidden Planet blog, July 24, 2009
 Trading Up: Razorjack, Lowdown, Broken Frontier, July 29, 2009

2001 comics debuts